Einheit SPD-KPD is an East German short subject documentary film about the merging of the Communist Party of Germany (KPD) and the Social Democratic Party of Germany (SPD) into the Socialist Unity Party of Germany (SED), directed by Kurt Maetzig. It was released in 1946.

External links
 

1946 films
East German films
1940s German-language films
Films directed by Kurt Maetzig
German black-and-white films
1946 documentary films
1940s short documentary films
1940s German films
Communist Party of Germany
Social Democratic Party of Germany
Socialist Unity Party of Germany